Grover Cleveland Fuller (March 18, 1885 – May 25, 1928) was an American champion jockey in Thoroughbred horse racing.  In 1903 he won the national riding title, a part of which were victories in the Futurity Stakes and the Suburban Handicap at Sheepshead Bay, New York, the two richest and most prestigious horse races in the United States at that time.

References

1885 births
1928 deaths
American jockeys
American Champion jockeys
People from DeWitt, Iowa